Pokémon Go (stylized as Pokémon GO) is a 2016 augmented reality (AR) mobile game, part of the Pokémon franchise, developed and published by Niantic in collaboration with Nintendo and The Pokémon Company for iOS and Android devices. It uses mobile devices with GPS to locate, capture, train, and battle virtual creatures, called Pokémon, which appear as if they are in the player's real-world location. The game is free-to-play; it uses a freemium business model combined with local advertising and supports in-app purchases for additional in-game items. The game launched with around 150 species of Pokémon, which had increased to around 700 by 2021.

Pokémon Go was released to mixed reviews; critics praised the concept but criticized technical problems. It was one of the most used and profitable mobile apps in 2016, having been downloaded more than 500 million times worldwide by the end of the year. It is credited with popularizing location-based and AR technology, promoting physical activity, and helping local businesses grow due to escalated foot traffic. However, it attracted controversy for contributing to accidents and creating public nuisances. Various governments expressed concerns about security, and some countries regulate its use.

Gameplay

Augmented reality gaming 
After establishing a game account, players create and customize their own avatars. Once created, an avatar is displayed on a map based on the player's geographical location. Features on the map include 'PokéStops' and 'Pokémon Gyms'. These PokéStops can be equipped with items called 'Lure Modules', which attract additional wild, and occasionally rare, Pokémon. Gyms serve as battle locations for team-based king of the hill matches. PokéStops and Gyms are typically located at places of interest. These locations were initially re-purposed portals from Ingress, Niantic's previous augmented reality (AR) game. This has led to PokéStops and Pokémon Gyms being placed at dangerous or inconvenient locations, such as a now-deleted Gym at the Korean Demilitarized Zone and Bagram Airforce Base, which was abandoned by U.S. forces in July 2021. Since 2019, these locations also include submissions from Go players which are largely reviewed by other players.

As players move within their real world surroundings, their avatars move within the game's map. Different Pokémon species reside in different areas of the world; for example, Water-type Pokémon are generally found near water. When a player encounters a Pokémon, it may be viewed either in AR mode or with a live rendered, generic background. If the player flees, the Pokémon will face the spot it was last engaged, except Nosepass, which will always face north because of its Pokédex entry. AR mode uses the camera and gyroscope on the player's mobile device to display an image of a Pokémon as though it were in the real world. Players can take screenshots of the Pokémon they encounter either with or without the AR mode activated.

Although the game is free to play, it supports in-app purchases, where players can purchase additional Poké Balls and other in-game items. These items include Incense, which attracts Pokémon to the player as they move for sixty minutes, Lure Modules, which  players use at PokéStops to attract Pokémon to their current location near the PokeStop, and Lucky Eggs, which double experience points gained for a thirty-minute period from use. All Pokémon are displayed with a Combat Power, which is a rough measure of how powerful that Pokémon is in battle. Generally, as players level up, they catch Pokémon with higher CP and Pokémon are somewhat harder to catch. The player can check how strong their Pokémon are by the "Appraisal" system.

Pokémon collection 
Unlike most other installments in the Pokémon series, players in Pokémon Go do not battle wild Pokémon to catch them. During an encounter with a wild Pokémon, a player may throw a Poké Ball at it by flicking it from the bottom of the screen up toward the Pokémon. If the Pokémon is caught, it will come under the ownership of the player. Factors in the success rate of catching a Pokémon include the Pokémon's catch rate, the timing, the type of Poké Ball used, etc. After catching a wild Pokémon, the player is awarded two types of in-game currencies: Candies and Stardust. The Candies awarded by a successful catch depend on what evolutionary chain a Pokémon belongs to. A player can use Stardust and Candies to raise a Pokémon's level and hence "Combat Power" (CP). However, only Candies are needed to evolve a Pokémon, except for certain Pokémon that might need special items. Each Pokémon evolution tree has its own type of Candy, which can only be used to evolve or level up. The maximum level a player can achieve was originally level 40, but expanded to 50 as of November 30, 2020. The player can also transfer the Pokémon back to the Pokémon Professor Willow to earn more Candies and create room for more Pokémon. Shiny Pokémon are available through multiple ways, mostly by chance. One popular goal of the game is to complete the entries in the Pokédex, a comprehensive Pokémon logbook, by catching and evolving them to collect every one in it.

In September 2016, Niantic introduced a "Buddy Pokémon" feature, which allows players to pick a Pokémon to appear alongside them on the profile screen, and receive in-game rewards and bonuses based on the chosen Pokémon. The feature was released later that month. Certain Pokémon have different distances that they need to be walked in order to receive candy. The more the player walks in real time, the more candy they can earn. During the same update, Niantic made it impossible for players with rooted or jailbroken devices to log into the game in an effort to reduce and prevent cheating.

On January 20, 2018, Pokémon Go held the first Community Day, a monthly event that increases the appearance rate of a specific Pokémon and offer an exclusive move to the final evolution of the featured Pokémon only if caught or evolved during the event window. Players also have a higher chance to catch the Shiny variant of the featured Pokémon. The first Community Day featured Pikachu, with the exclusive move Surf to Raichu.

Pokémon availabilities 
The game is regularly updated with new Pokémon, and as of March 25, 2022, there are just over 730 Pokémon in the game (not including regional varieties) out a total 898.

Regional Pokémon are often released together, such as Hoenn region Pokémon released in December 2017, Alolan variants in May 2018, Sinnoh region Pokémon(along with the Sinnoh Stone item used to evolve them) released in October 2018, Unova region Pokémon (and the Unova Stone) in September 2019, Kalos region Pokémon in December 2020, and again more Alola region Pokémon in March 2022.

Mythical and legendary Pokémon are often released individually (or in pairs/trios) in special events or quests. The first Legendary Pokémon released was Groudon, in December 2017. The Mythical Pokémon Meltal and its evolved form, Melmetal are so far the only Pokémon to have made their debut on Pokémon Go. Their release coincided with the release of Pokémon: Let's Go, Pikachu! and Let's Go, Eevee! on the Nintendo Switch, Pokémon Go introduced the new Mythical Pokémon Meltan originally as a teaser, later to be available to capture only in Pokémon Go via a "Mystery Box" item that could be obtained through transferring Pokémon from Pokémon Go to either Nintendo Switch Pokémon games, or by completing new Research Tasks.

In August 2020, Mega Evolution came to Pokémon Go with four Pokémon able to Mega Evolve into five forms.

Battle system

Gyms and Raids 
Players earn experience points for various in-game activities. Players rise in level as they earn experience points (XP), with various features being progressively unlocked. Most-notably, at level five, the player can battle at a Pokémon Gym and join one of three color-coded teams (red for Team Valor, blue for Team Mystic, or yellow for Team Instinct), which act as factions battling for control of Gyms within the Pokémon Go world.

In June 2017, Niantic announced that the game mechanics of Gyms would be revamped for a more teamwork-oriented experience; Gyms were disabled on June 19, 2017, with the new Gyms being released with the next app update a few days later. As of the update, Gyms included a spinnable component to receive in-game items such as Potions and Poké Balls. Additionally, Gyms are capped at containing six Pokémon, each of which must be unique in that Gym. Coins are now earned based on the amount of time the defending Pokémon has been in a Gym, as opposed to a one-per-day gym defender bonus of 10 coins per current defending Pokémon. Legendary, Mythical and Buddy Pokémon cannot be placed in Gyms.

In July 2017, Raid Battles were introduced. Raid Battles consist of a group of players gathering to confront an over-leveled Pokémon located in a Gym. If the Pokémon is defeated, the players gain the chance to catch a regular version of it. Raid difficulties range from 1 to 5, with 1 being of the lowest difficulty, and 5 being the most difficult to defeat. Level 5 raids are exclusive to Legendary Pokémon. The first of these, Articuno and Lugia, were released on July 22, 2017, after the Go Fest, with Moltres and Zapdos following. From September to November, the 3 Legendary Beasts: Entei, Raikou and Suicune, were released shortly after, rotating regions every month.  Following their departure, the Legendary Pokémon Ho-Oh appeared in Raid Battles from November 27, 2017, to December 12, 2017. In August 2020, level 3 Mega raids arrived with the introduction of Mega Evolution. At the same time, Level 2 and 4 raids were combined into Level 1 and 3 raids.

In May 2022, Raid Battle were updated to include the addition of Mega Legendary Pokémon, which were turned to 6 stars, the highest currently in the game. The only Pokémon included in these Raids were Mega Latios and Mega Latias.

In October 2022, a new form of raid battle called "Elite Raids" were introduced. Elite Raids differ to normal raids in a number of ways, most notably that they can only be battled in person, take 24 hours to start, and are extremely difficult, often requiring a large number of players to defeat the Pokémon. The only Pokémon featured in Elite Raids so far has been the "Unbound" form of Hoopa.

Trainer Battles 

In December 2018, Niantic added player vs player Trainer Battles. In January 2020, Niantic rolled out an online battle format Go Battle League which allows players to fight other players worldwide. Unlike the Trainer Battles format introduced in 2018, Go Battle League does not require physical proximity, scanning QR code on each other's phone, knowing each other's friend code, or any other real-world interactions between players. Instead, participating players are automatically paired by the game server via some variant of the Elo rating system.

Team Go Rocket battles 
In July 2019, Pokémon Go introduced Team GO Rocket battles. Team GO Rocket NPCs could be battled at PokéStops indicated with it twitching and being a dark color or in Team GO Rocket Balloons which follow the player on the map. After victory, the player has the opportunity to capture a "Shadow Pokémon" which are relatively low-leveled, angry-looking Pokémon. Shadow Pokemon have a higher attack stat but a lower defense stat than a normal Pokémon. After capture, the player can choose to purify the Shadow Pokémon. Purified Pokémon are higher-leveled than their Shadow counterparts, can learn an exclusive move when purified, and need fewer candies to evolve.

Development

Pre-release

The concept for the game was conceived in 2014 by Satoru Iwata of Nintendo and Tsunekazu Ishihara of The Pokémon Company as an April Fools' Day collaboration with Google, called the Google Maps: Pokémon Challenge. Ishihara was a fan of developer Niantic's previous transreality game, Ingress, and saw the game's concept as a perfect match for the Pokémon series. Niantic, a subsidiary of Google, used the crowdsourced data from Ingress to populate the locations for PokéStops and gyms within Pokémon Go, data from Google Maps to spawn specific Pokémon on certain terrain, and map display from OpenStreetMap since December 2017. The game's application logic uses the open source Kubernetes system - and due to the game's sheer scale of users, a number of bugs with the Kubernetes system was discovered and later fixed. Niantic was spun off from Google as an independent company in 2015 following the company reorganization into Alphabet Inc.

In 2015, Ishihara dedicated his speech at the game's announcement on September 10 to Iwata, who had died two months earlier. Tatsuo Nomura, who joined Niantic in 2015 after he developed the Google Maps Pokémon Challenge, acted as Director and Product Manager for the game. The game's soundtrack was written by longtime Pokémon series composer, Junichi Masuda, who also assisted with some of the game's design. Among the game's graphic designers was Dennis Hwang, who previously created the logo of Gmail while working for Google.

On March 4, 2016, Niantic announced a Japan-exclusive beta test would begin later that month, allowing players to assist in refining the game before its full release. The beta test was later expanded to other countries. On April 7, it was announced that the beta would expand to Australia and New Zealand. Then, on May 16, the signups for the field test were opened to the United States. The test came to an end on June 30.

Post-release
At the Comic-Con 2016, John Hanke, founder of Niantic, revealed the appearances of the three team leaders: Candela (Team Valor), Blanche (Team Mystic), and Spark (Team Instinct). Hanke conveyed that approximately 10% of the ideas for the game were implemented. Future updates, including the addition of trading, more Pokémon, implementation of Pokémon Centers at PokéStops, a patch for the "three step glitch", and easier training, were also confirmed. He also stated that Niantic would be continuing support for the game for "years to come". In an interview with TechCrunch in September 2016, Hanke hinted that player vs. player Pokémon battles would be released in a future update. In December 2016, coffeehouse chain Starbucks and telecommunications company Sprint collaborated with Nintendo to add PokéStops and gyms at certain locations of theirs throughout the United States. That same month, a companion app for Apple Watch devices was released, which allows users to receive notifications about nearby Pokémon, but does not allow for them to be caught. In January 2017, an additional 5,000 more Starbucks locations became available as gyms. In February 2017, an update was released which introduced over 100 species based in the Johto region from the second generation of the core Pokémon series, which were added alongside the original 151. The update also included the addition of new berries, new Pokémon encounter mechanics, and an expanded selection of avatar clothing options. Some of the Pokémon introduced in Ruby and Sapphire were added in late 2017, starting with a Halloween event in October and 50 more in December. A weather system was added alongside the latter, allowing real-world weather to affect gameplay. In November 2018, a game developed by Game Freak and heavily inspired by Pokémon Go, Pokémon: Let's Go, Pikachu! and Let's Go, Eevee! was released on the Nintendo Switch. This game will feature Pokémon Go style catching with Joy-Con and there has integration between the two games. In addition, new Pokémon Meltan was revealed in September, becoming the first new Pokémon to be released through Pokémon Go. On October 10, 2018, The Pokémon Company and Niantic announced plans to introduce Pokémon from Diamond and Pearl into Pokémon Go. On October 12, Niantic teased one of the Generation IV Pokémon that would be coming to Pokémon Go. On October 25, a feature known as Adventure Sync was announced, which will record the player's walking data in the background. On October 26, Niantic announced research tasks for Bug type Pokémon that will give players a chance to catch Shedinja throughout November.

According to John Hanke in a January 2019 interview with Business Insider, 2018 saw Go become the game initially envisioned by Niantic.

In 2020, Niantic made major changes to gameplay mechanisms to account for the COVID-19 pandemic which saw many players unable to leave their homes to play. These development shift saw changes like the addition of indoor step tracking to count toward in-game distance challenges, long distance PVP battles, increased "incense" effectiveness, increased spawn points, and a doubled player radius.

Pokémon Go Plus 

The Pokémon Go Plus is a Bluetooth Low Energy wearable device, developed by Nintendo's Platform Technology Development division, that allows players to perform certain actions in the game without looking at their smart device. When a player is near a Pokémon or PokéStop, the Plus vibrates. The player can then press the button to capture the Pokémon or receive items from the PokéStop; the player cannot check what they have received until the next time they sign into the app onto their mobile device. The design consists of a Poké Ball and the shape of the Google Maps pin. The decision to create the device rather than create a smartwatch app was to increase uptake among players for whom a smartwatch is prohibitively expensive. It was released in the United Kingdom and North America on September 16, 2016.

Release

Regional availability 

The game's official launch began on July 6, 2016, with releases in Australia, New Zealand, and the United States. Due to server strain from high demand upon release, Niantic CEO John Hanke stated that the release in other regions was to be "paused until Niantic was comfortable" fixing the issues. European releases started on July 13, and the game became available to most of the continent over the following ten days. The Japanese launch was initially reported to be on July 20; however, the game was delayed after a sponsorship deal with fast food chain McDonald's was leaked, instead releasing two days later. Although the game was proposed to be released in France on July 15, it was postponed until July 24 out of respect and due to safety concerns following a terrorist attack in Nice on July 14. Following the shut down of third-party apps and websites in late-July 2016—significantly reducing server strain—Niantic was able to continue pushing release worldwide. Central and South America and most of Southeast Asia subsequently saw releases in early August. Indonesia was the first Asian country to have the game playable, despite the game not being officially released in that region until August 6.

In South Korea, the game was not officially released as major restrictions on the use of online mapping data exist. However, due to a glitch, a small area around Sokcho in the northeastern part of the country was considered a part of Niantic's North Korea mapping region, making the game fully playable in that area. Numerous people took advantage of the gap to play the game. Bus tickets from the capital city of Seoul sold out and people living within Sokcho shared information on free Wi-Fi areas to tourists. Players also discovered a gym in Panmunjom, along the Korean Demilitarized Zone; however, Niantic later removed it from the game. Following the release of Pokémon Go in Japan, parts of Busan also became playable as parts of the city are considered part of Japan's mapping area due to the proximity of Tsushima Island. The game officially released in the country in January 2017.

In mainland China, Google services are banned by the Great Firewall, whereas the GPS function in the game is blocked by Niantic. Players of Pokémon Go in China have to download the game with App Store IDs from other regions and use VPN to access Google services in order to load the game, and some even use a GPS spoofing app to bypass the GPS blocking. Some players also downloaded a clone app called City Spirit Go, which was released shortly after Pokémon Go beta test in Japan. As of 2020, the official game is still unplayable in most parts of China with GPS modules being blocked in-game.

During its launch in Southeast Asia in August 2016, the game officially excluded Myanmar, but users in Thailand discovered that the game was fully playable in border cities near the nation. The game was released in the Balkans, Macau, and Central Asia in September 2016, and was also released throughout Africa, the Middle East, and South Asia by the end of the year.

On September 11, 2018, the game appeared in Russia's App Store and Google Play Store over two years after the first launch. However, Niantic did not officially announce the release.

Commercial response

Nintendo 

Investors were buoyed by the response to the initial release of Pokémon Go on July 7, with Nintendo's share price rising by an initial 10% and by July 14 shares rose to as high as 50%. Despite Nintendo only owning a 32% stake in The Pokémon Company and an undisclosed stake in Niantic, Nintendo's market value increased by US$9 billion within five days of release of Pokémon Go. The trend continued for more than a week after the game's release and by July 19, the stock value of Nintendo more than doubled as compared to pre-release. Turnover sales reached a record-breaking ¥703.6 billion (US$6.6 billion); and trading of the stock accounted for a quarter of all trades on the Tokyo Stock Exchange's main board. The Financial Times believed that investors were speculating not on Pokémon Go as such, but on future Nintendo app releases being as successful as the company moves more into the mobile app market—an area they were historically reluctant to enter in the belief it would cannibalise its portable console and video game sales. Nintendo plans to release four more smartphone app games by March 2017, and investors remarked that Pokémon Go showed Nintendo still has some of the "most valuable character intellectual property in the world" with franchises such as Super Mario, The Legend of Zelda, and Metroid.

By July 22, Nintendo gained ¥1.8 trillion ($17.6 billion) in market capitalization since the game's launch. However, following clarification from Nintendo that the company did not produce Pokémon Go nor had tangible financial gains from it, its stock fell by 18%—equating to a ¥708 billion ($6.7 billion) loss in market value—on July 25. This was the largest single-day decline for Nintendo since 1990 and the maximum one-day exchange of finances allowed on the Tokyo Stock Exchange. The company has an approximate 13% "effective economic stake" in the game, according to Macquarie Securities.

Other companies 
The surge in stocks extended beyond Nintendo, with Tomy, TV Tokyo, and the Bank of Kyoto, among other companies, all seeing significant gains. Similarly, Zagg, which owns a company that manufactures battery cases, saw a 25% rise in its stock in relation to Pokémon Go.

Technical issues 
At launch, the game suffered from frequent server outages due to extreme usage. The global server usage expectation for the game was surpassed within 15 minutes of the game's release in Australia and New Zealand, and peaked at 50 times expected traffic, or 10 times the expected worst-case scenario. Frequent crashes and authentication errors plagued the game's release and persisted for several days. For the first two days after launch, players were unable to access the game through their Pokémon Trainer Club accounts; only Gmail-based accounts were able to gain access to the game. Servers again suffered frequent outages in Australia on July 11; players blamed people in the United Kingdom for bypassing local servers and using Australian ones to play the game before its official release. On July 16, a few hours after the release in many European countries, the game's servers temporarily went down. The outage was claimed by a hacking group called "PoodleCorp", who said they used a DDoS attack to take them down, although the problem was fixed later that day. The next day, the servers went down again as the game was launched in Canada. John Hanke issued an apology for the server issues at San Diego Comic Con 2016, stating "we weren't provisioned for what happened".

Some early iOS installs of Pokémon Go required users to provide the app with full access to their Google accounts, thereby allowing the app to "access players' Gmail-based email, Google Drive-based files, photos and videos stored in Google Photos, and any other content within their Google accounts". The Pokémon Company and Niantic responded to the concerns, recognizing that the iOS app, at the time, "... erroneously requests full access permission for the user's Google account ..." However, Adam Reeve—the person who initially made claims of the security issues in a Tumblr post—later backtracked on his claim and was not "100 percent sure" it was valid. Dan Guido, CEO of the security company Trail of Bits, analyzed the app's programming and discovered that although the game did request full account access, this did not enable third-party usage as initially conveyed. Guido found that this did enable Niantic to access people's email addresses and phone numbers unintentionally. A subsequent iOS app update reduced the scope of access. Niantic also issued a statement assuring users that no information was collected nor was any information beyond what was necessary to use the app accessed.

Alongside server issues, Pokémon Go suffered from several glitches. One of the more prominent bugs appeared in mid-July 2016 and rendered the game's tracking feature useless. Normally, this feature shows between zero and three footprints to inform the player of how close they are to a nearby Pokémon; however, it universally became "stuck" at three steps, earning it the name "three-step-glitch". Niantic removed the footstep feature altogether on July 30, sparking criticism from players. By August 1, players reported a new glitch that swaps their captured Pokémon with another creature at random. Another bug, confirmed by Niantic in August, inadvertently made capturing Pokémon more difficult. Some legendary Pokémon, which are rare and powerful versions of the creatures, were also obtained by players in a glitch, though they were later removed from the accounts of the trainers to keep the game fair.

Reception 

Pokémon Go released to "mixed or average" reviews, according to review aggregator Metacritic. Upon release, critics called the experience enjoyable, but noted the game's technical issues.

Critics praised various aspects of Pokémon Go. Oscar Dayus (Pocket Gamer) said that the game was an immensely enjoyable experience and continued with how "the very personal nature of catching Pokémon in your own neighborhood made me smile more than any game has for years". Jeremy Parish (US Gamer) compared the game and its social aspects to a massively multiplayer online game. Reviewers also praised the game enabling the promotion of physical exercise. Terri Schwartz (IGN) said it was "secretly the best exercise app out there" and that it changed her daily walking routine. Patrick Allen (Lifehacker) wrote an article with tips about how to work out using Pokémon Go. Julia Belluz (Vox) said it could be the "greatest unintentional health fad ever" and wrote that one of the results of the game that the developers may not have realized was that "it seems to be getting people moving". Users took an extra 194 steps per day once they started using the app, which approximated to 26% more than usual. IGN named it the 100th best video game of all time in 2018.

Philip Kollar and Allegra Frank (Polygon) both agreed that Pokémon Go was "an exciting social experience", but were not sure how long the game and its popularity would last, stating it could either last for coming years or "end up as a brush fire craze that the whole gaming world is talking about for a few weeks and then is forgotten".

Other critics expressed more negative opinions of the game, with many citing frequent crashes and other technical issues, along with shallow gameplay. Kallie Plagge (IGN) said that although the game lacked in polish and depth, the overall experience made up for it. Matt Peckham (Time) criticized the game for its frequent crashes. Mike Cosimano (Destructoid) also took issue with the game, saying the original idea showed promise, but was improperly executed. Kat Brewster (The Guardian) wrote that although she thought Pokémon Go was not a good game, it was "a great experience". The server problems also received negative press. Miguel Concepcion (GameSpot) said that although he enjoyed the game's strong social appeal and visual design, the game's "initial iteration is a buggy mess on all levels", with one of the reasons being the constant server problems. Another glitch that appeared a few days after launch was the "three-step glitch", which made it impossible to "hunt down a specific Pokémon". Patricia Hernandez (Kotaku) said, "the three step glitch adds to what has been a terrible launch for Pokémon Go". Critics also emphasized on the large gap between the rural and urban players. Rural players seem to be at a major disadvantage when playing the game, while city players have access to more PokéStops and Gyms.

Downloads and revenue

2016 

Pokémon Go rapidly rose the American iOS App Store's "Top Grossing" and "Free" charts. The game has become the fastest game to top the App Store and Google Play, beating Clash Royale, and it became the most downloaded app on the App Store of any app in their first week. Within two days of release, it was installed on more than 5% of Android devices in the United States, according to SimilarWeb, According to Sensor Tower, the game was downloaded more than 10 million times within a week of release, becoming the fastest such app to do so, and reached 15 million global downloads by July 13. According to SurveyMonkey the game became the most active mobile game in the United States ever with 21 million active users on July 12, eclipsing Candy Crush Sagas peak of 20 million. By July 15, approximately 1.3 million people were playing the game in the Netherlands, despite the app not being officially released in the country at the time. On the day of release in Japan, more than 10 million people downloaded the game, including 1.3 million in the first three hours. By July 31, the game exceeded 100 million downloads worldwide, according to App Annie and Sensor Tower. On August 8, Pokémon Go reached the milestone of over 100 million downloads on Google Play alone after barely 33 days on the market.

On August 12, 2016, the Financial Times reported that Pokémon Go reached  in revenue after five weeks counting only the U.S., British, and German markets. The average daily usage of the app on Android devices in July 2016 exceeded that of Snapchat, Tinder, Twitter, Instagram, and Facebook. Due by the game's massive popularity, several app developers became focused on developing similar AR apps using available software development kits (SDK). By September 2, 2016, Pokémon Go had generated more than $440 million in worldwide revenue, according to Sensor Tower. By September 30, it had received  downloads and grossed  in 80 days, according to market research firm Newzoo. Pokémon Go reached the milestone of $600 million in revenue after only 90 days on the market, becoming the fastest mobile game ever to do so.

Besides in-game purchases, partnerships with retail chains like Starbucks, McDonald's, Sprint,  pay Niantic Labs for "Foot Traffic" on-demand of the retail shops.

The game was awarded five Guinness World Records in August 2016: most revenue grossed by a mobile game in its first month; most downloaded mobile game in its first month (130 million downloads); most international charts topped simultaneously for a mobile game in its first month (top game in 70 different countries); most international charts topped simultaneously for a mobile game in its first month (top grossing in 55 countries simultaneously); and fastest time to gross $100 million by a mobile game (reached in 20 days on July 26). By September 2016, Pokémon Go had been downloaded over 500 million times worldwide, and became the fastest game to make over $500 million in revenue. Pokémon Go was awarded the App Store's breakout hit of 2016. Pokémon Go was reported to be the most searched game on Google in 2016.

Usage of the game in the United States peaked on July 15, and by mid-September, had lost 79% of its players there. Forbes said "the vaguely curious stopped playing and the more committed players ran up against a fairly unsatisfying endgame". In October 2016, Niantic released a Halloween-themed event, which saw a surge in revenue up to 133% as reported by Sensor Tower, placing the game back to top of the charts of highest grossing apps. It was reported that the game earned approximately $23.3 million between October 25 and 29, up from approximately $10 million between October 18 and 22. According to App Annie, Pokémon Go grossed an estimated  in 2016.

2017–2021 
In February 2017, Pokémon Go was awarded being the best app at the Crunchies award event. By February 2017, the game has been downloaded more than  times worldwide, with a reported  in revenue made, becoming the fastest mobile game ever to do so. By June 2017, the game was downloaded more than 750 million times, with an estimated revenue of  according to Apptopia. According to mobile app research firm Apptopia, approximately 60 million users were still playing the game a year after launch. In May 2018, The Pokémon Company announced that the game reached over 800million downloads worldwide. Forbes estimated that the game may have come close to 900million downloads by September 2018. The top five countries where it has received the most downloads are the United States (21%), Brazil (9.3%), India (8.6%), Mexico (5.5%), and Indonesia (5%). As of February 2019, the game has been downloaded by over 1billion people worldwide.

SuperData Research reported that, in May 2018, Pokémon Go grossed  in monthly revenue and had  monthly active players, its highest since Summer 2016. In July 2018, Pokémon Go was the top-grossing mobile app of the month. Pokémon Go live events earned  in tourism revenue during 2019. According to Sensor Tower in November 2020, Pokémon Go had accumulated nearly  unique installs and generated almost  in revenue from in-game purchases via the iOS App Store and Google Play. Its largest market in terms of both installs and revenue is the United States, followed by Japan and Germany in revenue and by Brazil and Mexico in installs.

During 2020, with the COVID-19 pandemic causing restrictions on the ability of players to play Go outside their homes, Niantic implemented new features which allowed players to play the game from inside their homes, and this was credited with increasing its playerbase throughout the year despite the restrictions. Despite a brief drop early in the pandemic, the number of monthly active users of the game rose by 45 percent between January and August 2020, and the game's revenue in 2020 was the highest in its history, exceeding even its 2016 revenue. The game generated a further  in the first half of 2021.

Community and cultural impact 

The game was referred to as a "social media phenomenon" which has brought people together from all walks of life. 231 million people engaged in 1.1 billion interactions that mentioned Pokémon Go on Facebook and Instagram in the month of July. Numerous media outlets referred to the surge in popularity as "Pokémon Go Mania", or simply "Pokémania". The massive popularity of the game resulted in several unusual positive effects. For example, the game placed players where they can help catch criminals and report crimes in progress, although it has also placed some in harm's way, and has even aided law enforcement's community relations, albeit with caveats. Businesses also benefited from the nearby presence of PokéStops (or them being PokéStops themselves) with the concomitant influx of people, and the intense exploration of communities has brought local history to the forefront. The game was also seen bringing its players to places of worship, as many Pokégyms are located there. Despite some criticism by religious leaders, this was received positively by religious groups, who saw it as reminding adherents to come and pray. Some establishments considered purchasing lures in the game to attract additional players to PokéStops on their property. Within a week of its release, a secondary market emerged for the game, both for the resell of high-level accounts on Craigslist and PlayerUp, and for the sale of expert advice on Thumbtack. Wireless provider T-Mobile US started an offer for free data for a year for Pokémon Go sessions, and Yelp added a filter that only shows businesses which have a PokéStop nearby. National parks across the United States saw an influx of visitors due to the game, with "hundreds or thousands" of people visiting the National Mall and Memorial Parks in Washington, D.C. on the weekend following Pokémon Go release in the country. Small museums with PokéStops placed at exhibits also reported increased attendance, such as the McNay Art Museum in San Antonio, Texas, and the Morikami Museum and Japanese Gardens in Boca Raton, Florida. Charity organizations also sought engagement from players, with animal shelters offering dog walks to people who want to hatch eggs.

Eduardo Paes, then-mayor of Rio de Janeiro, stated that he hoped the app would be released in Brazil before the start of the 2016 Summer Olympics in the city (and it was, on August 3), and United States presidential candidates Donald Trump and Hillary Clinton mentioned the app during their 2016 election campaigns. In late July 2016, during a public address, the President of Italy, Sergio Mattarella, compared a political issue about the date of an incoming referendum as preposterous as the hunt for the Pokémon. Shortly after the game's release, Bellator mixed martial artist Michael Page celebrated a knockout of his match opponent, Evangelista Santos by putting on a red Ash Ketchum-like hat and rolling a prop Poké Ball in Santos's direction. On July 25, Dwayne Johnson released a promo video featuring MatPat and Ali-A with himself as a tough, rare Pokémon.

The game was credited for popularizing AR, and was praised by genderfluid groups for letting the players choose a "style" instead of "gender". The game also had a positive impact among individuals with autism. The "Pokémon Theme" from the animated series saw a 630% increase in listeners on music streaming platform Spotify during the month of the game's release. Meanwhile, streaming services such as Hulu experienced an increased viewership of the Pokémon series and films. Nintendo reported that sales of the 3DS Pokémon games rose as a result of the game's popularity. A Twitch channel, Twitch Plays Pokémon Go, was created that mimics the crowd-played Twitch Plays Pokémon channel, allowing viewers to direct a virtual avatar in the game using an iPhone programmed to spoof its location. Niantic later issued permanent bans to those who cheated the game by means such as GPS spoofing and bots. Pokémon-themed pornography increased in popularity after the release of the game. xHamster, an adult video streaming website, reported that within 5 days of the game's release, Pokémon related terms were the most searched for videos. Another adult video streaming website, Pornhub, reported that Pokémon related searches spiked 136%. Pokémon Go was spoofed in the Maroon 5 music video, "Don't Wanna Know". In the 2016 Doctor Who Christmas special, "The Return of Doctor Mysterio", the Doctor creates a distraction by "flood[ing] the downstairs with Pokémon", causing the people to run off with their cell phones. In the episode "Looking for Mr. Goodbart" from the 28th season of The Simpsons, the people of Springfield become addicted to Peekimon Get, a parody of Pokémon Go.

Gos release resulted in a resurgence in popularity for the Pokémon franchise as a whole. The Pokémon Sun and Moon games for the Nintendo 3DS, released later in 2016, was the best-selling video game for the 3DS with over 16 million copies sold, and this was partly attributed to the new fans to the series brought in by Go. In an interview, director of Sun and Moon Shigeru Ohmori remarked that the Ultra Sun and Ultra Moon sequels were designed partly to facilitate entry for newcomers to the franchise brought in by Go. The first Pokémon games for the Nintendo Switch, Pokémon: Let's Go, Pikachu! and Let's Go, Eevee!, took significant inspirations from Go. A line of official Go merchandise was released in November 2019.

In addition to standard gameplay, the game has held several in-game and live events. The first live event officially held by Niantic was held in Charlotte, North Carolina, in May 2017. In July 2017, a community event was held in Grant Park, Chicago, in honor of the first anniversary of the game's release. Despite the fact that almost no information about the event, including ticket prices and attractions, was released by Niantic ahead of the ticket sale, over 20,000 tickets sold out within a half hour. During the event itself, attendees suffered connectivity issues and crashes, due to the heavy amount of localized cellular activity. Afterwards, Niantic announced that they would refund everybody who bought a ticket, as well as give them $100 of in-game currency. Following the event, around two dozen attendees filed suit against Niantic, seeking travel reimbursement.

Following the event in Chicago, other events have been held in Chester, Yokohama, and San Jose. In September 2017, a series of events named "Safari Zone" was held in Unibail-Rodamco shopping centers in Oberhausen, Paris and Barcelona, with events the following month in Copenhagen, Prague, Stockholm and Amstelveen.

In January 2018, Niantic announced monthly community event Community Day which aims to get players to meet up in their local areas.  During a multi-hour period, players can encounter more frequent wild spawns of a particular Pokémon, an exclusive move for that Pokémon (or its evolution), an increased probability for the shiny form of that Pokémon, and bonuses such as extra stardust or XP. The Community Days in 2018 featured Pikachu (January 20), Dratini (February 24), Bulbasaur (March 25), Mareep (April 15), Charmander (May 19), Larvitar (June 16), Squirtle (July 8), Eevee (August 11–12), Chikorita (September 22), Beldum (October 21), and Cyndaquil (November 10).

Pokémon Go in Syria is a photography series published in 2016 by Syrian artist Khaled Akil. Akil places Pokémon characters in destroyed Syrian streets as a reminder for a world lost behind the screen. While Pokemon Go was trending worldwide, Akil couldn't help but notice how the media forgot about the war in Syria. So he visualised his idea in the form of digital collages. Khaled's Pokemon series quickly went viral across the globe after he posted it online. This photography series was exhibited in various locations including the American University Museum.

Criticism and incidents 

The app was criticized for using locations such as cemeteries and memorials as sites to catch Pokémon, including the Auschwitz-Birkenau State Museum, the United States Holocaust Memorial Museum, the National September 11 Memorial & Museum, Arlington National Cemetery, the ANZAC War Memorial, and Hiroshima Peace Memorial Park. Niantic later removed content from sensitive areas such as the Hiroshima Memorial and Holocaust Museum. The game sparked complaints from Dutch company ProRail, who said that players entered their railway tracks, and fire stations told players to not impede their staff by congregating outside.

The game's distribution of PokéStops and gyms (derived from the portals in Ingress, Niantic's science fiction-themed AR game) was noted to be sparser in many minority neighborhoods in a reflection of American demographics. Players in rural areas also complained about the lack of Pokémon spawns, PokéStops, and gyms in their area.  Pokémon Go was criticized for game accessibility issues by players with physical disabilities. The AbleGamers Foundation COO, Steve Spohn, said that when Pokémon Go was compared to other mobile games, it "excludes disabled players to a significant degree".

Police departments in various countries issued warnings, some tongue-in-cheek, regarding inattentive driving, trespassing, and being targeted by criminals due to being unaware of one's surroundings. In the state of New York, sex offenders are banned from playing the app while on parole. Bosnian players were warned to stay out of minefields left over from the 1990s Bosnian War. In Russia, a 21-year-old video blogger, Ruslan Sokolovsky, was arrested in September 2016 for two months after playing Pokémon Go at the Church of All Saints in Yekaterinburg, and eventually received a suspended sentence for three and a half years in prison for charges of blasphemy.

People have suffered various injuries from accidents related to the game. In Japan, the first accident occurred within hours of the game's release. The first death in Japan attributed to Pokémon Go occurred in late August 2016. A distracted driver playing the game killed one woman and seriously injured another. The 39-year-old farmer did not notice the women crossing a street and struck them with his truck. The woman died of a broken neck. Japan's National Police Agency said it was the 79th Pokémon Go-related accident in the country. On August 11, 2016, a young girl in Cambodia was reportedly killed after being hit by a car while trying to capture a Pokémon on a road. The case was the first death related to Pokémon Go among Southeast Asian countries. In January 2017, Chinese-American civilian Jiansheng Chen was shot dead while playing Pokémon Go.

Al-Azhar University in Cairo described the game as "harmful mania." A Cossack leader declared that it "smacks of Satanism", Kuwait banned the game from government sites, Indonesian officials deemed it a national security threat, and in Israel the IDF banned the game from Army bases out of security considerations. In Saudi Arabia, the General Secretariat of the Council of Senior Scholars declared, in light of a 2001 fatwa banning the Pokémon card game as a form of gambling, that the electronic app required a new ruling. This was also followed by both Indian and Malaysian Islamic leaders telling Indian and Malaysian Muslims to avoid the game.

During Thailand's 2016 constitutional referendum polling, Pokémon Go players were told to refrain from entering polling stations. Thus the Thai National Broadcasting and Communications Commission intends to ask Niantic to remove Pokémon characters and PokéStops from locations such as government facilities, historic and religious sites, private property as well as dangerous spots such as narrow footpaths and rivers. Cambodia has banned the game in a former genocide site after Pokémon players showed up at the site. Vietnam has banned players from entering the government and defense offices. The Vietnamese Ministry of Information and Communications is also considering the game's negative impact to Vietnamese society, where many people left home at night, crossed the road or drove on the street with their eyes kept focused on phones, which brought the need to ban the game in the country. Following the move by other Southeast Asian neighbors, the Philippines also banned the game in all administration offices. According to a survey by Malaysian Employers Federation (MEF), around 4% of employers in Malaysia fired their staff for playing the game during working hours.

Russia also voiced their concerns over the application, with Nikolay Nikiforov, the country's Minister of Communications and Mass Media, suspecting foreign intelligence agencies using the application to collect information, while some fundamentalist religious groups in the region claim it to be demonic. The Supreme Council of Virtual Space in Iran officially banned the game in August 2016 over security concerns. The same month, The Pentagon facility in U.S. restricted the use of the game on their property, citing security risks by collecting secret information. In the United Kingdom, 290 police incidents were reported to have occurred in July 2016 in the country due to the game. In September 2016, Niantic stopped supporting the CyanogenMod mobile operating system. This prevented users playing on CyanogenMod from playing the game from that point forward.

In India, the Gujarat High Court issued a notice to Niantic, the developer of the popular AR-based game, on the grounds of "posing danger to public safety".
The notice was issued on a PIL (Public Interest Litigation) seeking a ban on the location-based AR reality game in India. In addition,
a second PIL was filed against the developers of Pokémon Go for hurting religious sentiments by showing images of eggs in places of worship of different religious groups. But the Indian Government refused to ban the game.

Pokémon Gos targeted local advertising has been described by Shoshana Zuboff in The Age of Surveillance Capitalism as an experiment that initiated from Google to move targeted advertising from the digital domain (cost per click) into the physical domain (cost per visit) by the use of sponsored locations. "In the end we recognize that the probe was designed to explore the next frontier: the means of behavioral modification. The game about the game is, in fact, an experimental facsimile of surveillance capitalism's design for our future."

Third-party services 

Multiple unofficial, third-party apps were created to correspond with Pokémon Go. Notable apps include "Poké Radar" and "Helper for Pokémon Go", where players can crowdsource much of the Pokémon that can be found in the game at a particular time. At its peak of popularity, "Poké Radar" hit #2 on the Apple App Store, behind Pokémon Go itself.

Another app, GoChat, which allows players to leave messages for other players at specific locations, accrued more than 1 million downloads in five days and reached the top 10 in the Apple App Store and Google Play Store. However, the app's developer Jonathan Zarra chose to leave the app unmonetized and had financial trouble keeping the app's servers online until bringing on angel investor and board member Michael Robertson. After acquiring significant funding, the app reached over 2 million active users. According to RiskIQ, at least 215 fake versions of the game were available by July 17, 2016. Several of these fake apps contained malicious programming and viruses.

Launched on July 22, 2016, "Pokévision" enabled players to find exactly where Pokémon spawned and how much time was left until they despawned; the site used data hacked directly from the game. In the five days following the website's launch, 27 million unique visitors used the site. On July 31, multiple search apps and sites, including Pokévision, were disabled as they violated Niantic's terms of service.

COVID-19 pandemic
During the COVID-19 pandemic, Niantic responded by implementing new changes and features in the game which allowed players to easily play remotely. However, starting on August 1, 2021, Niantic began rolling back these changes as part of their Exploration Bonus Updates. Players in New Zealand and the United States were the first to receive the post-pandemic changes, and gradually, they will be rolled out to the rest of the world "in accordance with recommendations from global health organizations." In fear of violations in health and personal safety regulations, as well as negatively impacting players with disabilities, the company has since received heavy criticism from the player base (including top players Brandon Tan and Nick Oyzon) due to their reverting safety measures implemented during the pandemic, in which gym and Pokéstop interaction distances were increased from 40 to 80 metres. Despite increasing rates of the SARS-CoV-2 Delta variant in various U.S. states (resulting in overflowing hospitals), Niantic are firm on not keeping the pandemic bonuses. Players began boycotting Pokémon Go since in first week of August 2021.

On Twitter, the #HearUsNiantic started trending worldwide as fans and players voiced their censure towards Niantic's decision in removing the pandemic bonuses. A letter was sent to Niantic, which responded to the community by stating that the pandemic changes will not stay. As Niantic are an AR company, part of their business strategy is to sell user data by players after completing AR Mapping tasks where they can log their surroundings at marked PokéStops in their in-game maps. The reduced distance means an increased potential for Niantic to generate more revenue. Another reason for their changes is for Niantic to preserve their image of being an AR tech giant; on their blog post they stated that it is their "mission" to "encourage outdoor exploration" and "to connect [people] to real places in the real world, and to visit places that are worth exploring." Players have also speculated that Niantic are rolling back the pandemic bonuses in an effort to send players closer to sponsored businesses such as McDonald's (marked by a PokéStop or gym), from which Niantic have made a lot of money.

Awards

See also 
 List of highest-grossing mobile games
 List of Pokémon, the list of all of the original Pokémon by order

Notes

References

External links 

 

2010s fads and trends
2016 video games
Android (operating system) games
Augmented reality games
Free-to-play video games
IOS games
Niantic, Inc. games
Location-based games
Pervasive games
Go
Pokémon spin-off games
Video game controversies
Video games developed in the United States
Video games featuring protagonists of selectable gender
Proprietary cross-platform software
WatchOS software
Video games scored by Junichi Masuda
Vertically-oriented video games
BAFTA winners (video games)
The Game Awards winners